Lebanese New Zealanders refers to citizens or permanent residents of New Zealand of Lebanese ancestry. The community is diverse, having a large Christian religious base, being mostly Maronite Catholics and Greek Orthodox, while also having a small Muslim group of both the Shia and Sunni branches of Islam.

Lebanon, in both its modern-day form as the Lebanese state (declared in 1920, granted independence in 1943) and its historical form as the region of the Lebanon, has been a source of migrants to New Zealand for over two centuries. According to 2013 census, 1,044 Lebanese-descent people in New Zealand, with most of all people with Lebanese ancestry living in Auckland Region (44.0 percent), followed by the Wellington Region (22.4 percent), and the Otago Region (8.6 percent). Furthermore, 68.4 percent were born in New Zealand, up from 67.2 percent in 2006.

History

As part of a large scale emigration in the 1840s, numerous Lebanese (mostly Christians) migrated in great numbers out of Lebanon to various destinations. Most emigrated to Brazil and other Latin American nations, particularly Argentina, Venezuela, Colombia and Ecuador. Many also went to the United States, Canada, the United Kingdom, or the United Arab Emirates and others to Australia and New Zealand.

Thus, New Zealand's Lebanese population is one of the older established non-English speaking minorities in the country (though many Lebanese people now speak English, to a greater or lesser extent). 

In the 1890s, there were increasing numbers of Lebanese immigrants to New Zealand, part of the mass emigration from the area of the Lebanon that would become the modern Lebanese state, and also from the Anti-Lebanon Mountains region of the border area with Syria.

Some Lebanese people had settled in Auckland as early as 1890. The Lebanese blended into the community and attended local churches. Their language ability and entrepreneurial skills, along with a sense of belonging, gave them the confidence to integrate without losing their tradition and culture connection.

Early Lebanese settler Assid Abraham Corban and his family were instrumental in introducing commercial winemaking to New Zealand. The Corban family migrated to West Auckland from Dhour El Choueir in 1892, establishing Corbans Wines at Henderson in 1902.

Religious diversity
In New Zealand, 49% of Lebanese are Christian, while a minority (8%) are Muslim. 24.0 percent said they had no religion.

All main Lebanese religious groups — Christians, including Maronites, Greek Orthodox,  Melkites, Protestants, Muslims, including Shi'a and Sunnis denominations; Druze, amongst others — are now represented.

See also

 Egyptian New Zealanders
 Syrian New Zealanders
 Jewish New Zealanders
 Arab New Zealanders

References

External links
 World Lebanese Cultural Union (WLCU) Geographic-Regional Council (GRC) for Australia and New Zealand

Arab New Zealander
 
Ethnic groups in New Zealand
New Zealand